Charlotte Moore may refer to:

Charlotte Moore (TV executive) (born 1968), British television executive
Charlotte Moore (actress) (born c. 1958), Canadian actress
Charlotte Moore Sitterly (1898–1990), American astronomer
Charlotte Moore (runner) (born 1985), participant in the 2003 World Championships in Athletics
Charlotte Moore (wheelchair basketball) (born 1998), British wheelchair racer and wheelchair basketball player
Charlotte Moore (BoJack Horseman), a character on BoJack Horseman voiced by Olivia Wilde
 Charlotte Moore, a character in The Shrike (film) played by Joy Page
 Charlotte Moore, a stage actress, artistic director of the Irish Repertory Theatre (in New York City) and one of its founders
 Charlotte Moore (died 2010), wife of Mal Moore

See also